Romance and Arabella is a 1919 American silent romantic comedy film directed by Walter Edwards and starring Constance Talmadge, Harrison Ford, and Monte Blue.

Plot
As described in a film magazine review, Arabella Cadenhouse is a very young widow and seeks thrills in her next match. She is loved by Bill, a long-time sweetheart, but decides that life with him would be too placid. Each man she meets attracts her anew. She finally decides on a noted doctor, but when he appears one-half hour late she becomes infuriated and refuses to marry him, and continues the wedding with Bill instead.

Cast

References

Bibliography
 Goble, Alan. The Complete Index to Literary Sources in Film. Walter de Gruyter, 1999.

External links

Lantern slide (archived)

1919 films
1919 romantic comedy films
American romantic comedy films
Films directed by Walter Edwards
American silent feature films
Selznick Pictures films
American black-and-white films
1910s English-language films
1910s American films
Silent romantic comedy films
Silent American comedy films